The women's singles was one of five events of the 1922 World Hard Court Championships tennis tournament held in Brussels, Belgium from 13 until 21 May 1922. The draw consisted of 34 players. Suzanne Lenglen successfully defended her title, defeating Elizabeth Ryan 6–3, 6–2  in the final.

Draw

Finals

Top half

Section 1

Section 2

Bottom half

Section 3

Section 4

References 

Women's Singles
World Hard Court Championships